Vanceboro is the name of several places in the United States of America:

 Vanceboro, Maine, a town
 Vanceboro (CDP), Maine, the main village in the town
 Vanceboro, North Carolina, a town